David Cummings (7 May 1894 - 21 January 1987) was a British athlete who competed at the 1924 Summer Olympics.

References

1894 births
1987 deaths
Athletes (track and field) at the 1924 Summer Olympics
British male steeplechase runners
Olympic athletes of Great Britain